Gareth Allen  (born 9 September 1988 in Mynydd Isa, near Buckley, Flintshire) is a Welsh former professional snooker player.

Career
Allen started playing snooker aged three, joining his local snooker club and playing on full sized table at twelve. In a lengthy amateur career, Allen made his debut for the Welsh international side aged eighteen, where he reached the last 16 of the 2010 Amateur World Snooker Championship and narrowly missed out on a professional tour card in 2013, where he lost in the final to Robin Hull in the EBSA European Snooker Championships. He was also a regular competitor in Players Tour Championship events, where in the professional rounds he beat pros such as Kurt Maflin, Alfie Burden, Andrew Norman, Joel Walker and Nigel Bond.

He was also a regular competitor in the end of season Q School events since their introduction and in 2012 he lost in a quarter-final match against Paul Davison, which would have gained him pro tour status had he won. However, his run did enable him to feature in several ranking events during the 2012–13 season, with the highlight being a win over then top 32 player Rory McLeod 4–2 in qualifying in his home event the 2013 Welsh Open. His next match against John Higgins was televised, which he lost 4–1.

In 2015, Allen was successful in Q School and earned a tour card for the 2015–16 and 2016–17 seasons by beating Alex Taubman 4–2 in his final match of Event 2. He won his first match as a professional by beating Adam Edge 5–3 in Australian Goldfields Open qualifying, but lost 5–1 to Jamie Burnett in the second round. Allen saw off Barry Pinches and Aditya Mehta both 5–1 in the qualifying rounds for the Shanghai Masters, before losing by a reversal of this scoreline to Li Hang. He made his debut at the venue stage of a ranking event in York for the UK Championship and was defeated 6–1 by Liang Wenbo. Allen then lost 15 successive matches from August 2015 until the start of the 2016–17 season, when he beat Kurt Maflin 4–3 to qualify for the Riga Masters. Allen won a match at the venue stage of a ranking event for the first time by edging past Ross Muir 4–3 in the opening round of the Scottish Open and then lost 4–3 to Mike Dunn. A 5–4 win over Robin Hull saw him qualify for the China Open, where he was beaten 5–0 by Ronnie O'Sullivan in the second round. Allen fell off the tour at the end of the season as he was placed 110th in the world rankings.
Following his relegation from the tour, Allen announced his retirement from the game and started coaching after gaining his coaching qualification through the WPBSA.

Performance and rankings timeline

Career finals

Amateur finals: 2

References

External links

Official Website
Gareth Allen at CueTracker.net: Snooker Results and Statistic Database
Gareth Allen at worldsnooker.com

1988 births
People from Buckley, Flintshire
Sportspeople from Flintshire
Living people
Welsh snooker players